Pyotr Ivanovich Shchukin (1853 – 12 October 1912) was an art collector who built an important collection of Russian ancient art and artifacts and owned several impressionist masterpieces.

Early life and family
Pyotr Ivanovich Shchukin was born in 1853, one of ten children of Ivan Vassilievitch Shchukin, a self-made Moscow merchant in the textile trade from an Old Believer background who acquired a wealth of 4 million gold rubles, and his wife Ekaterina Shchukin, the daughter of Pyotr Konovich Botkin, a tea merchant and patron of the arts. I.V. Shchukin and Sons became one of the largest textile companies in Russia.

Art collecting
Shchukin built an important collection of Russian ancient art and artifacts and owned several impressionist masterpieces. His younger brother, Sergei Shchukin, was also a noted art collector while his brother Dimitri Shchukin assembled "Moscow's best collection of Old Masters" that eventually entered the Pushkin Museum. Another brother, Ivan, also collected art.

He was a customer of French art dealer Paul Durand-Ruel and accompanied his brother Sergei on buying trips to Paris.

When Shchukin was blackmailed by a former mistress and needed money to pay her off, he sold his Impressionist paintings to Sergei rather than sell them back to Durand-Ruel for less.

Death
Shchukin died on 12 October 1912.

References

External links

http://www.artmaecenas.ru/schukin_family/schukin_pi/index.php
https://artinvestment.ru/en/news/artnews/20110212_collections.html
https://www.theguardian.com/artanddesign/2011/aug/04/beverly-whitney-kean-obituary

1853 births
1912 deaths
Russian businesspeople
Russian art collectors
Businesspeople in textiles